Lake Forest School District, in Kent County, Delaware, was created when funding was not sufficient for three proximal districts (Harrington School District, Felton School District, and Frederica School District) so the three were merged to create a new combined district in 1969. Its headquarters are in an unincorporated area of Kent County with a Felton postal address.

It includes Bowers, Felton, Harrington, Viola, most of Riverview, most of Frederica, and some of Woodside East.

Schools 
 High schools
 Lake Forest High School

 Middle schools
Chipman (W.T.) Middle School

 Elementary schools
Lake Forest Central Elementary School
Lake Forest East Elementary School
Lake Forest North Elementary School
Lake Forest South Elementary School

Early childhood centers
Delaware Early Childhood Center

References

External links 
Lake Forest School District

School districts in Kent County, Delaware
School districts established in 1969
1969 establishments in Delaware